Roy Thomas Hartsfield (October 25, 1925 – January 15, 2011) was a second baseman and manager in Major League Baseball; his MLB playing and managing careers each lasted three years.  Hartsfield played his entire major league career with the Boston Braves from 1950 to 1952. He was then traded to the Brooklyn Dodgers for outfielder Andy Pafko. 

Hartsfield spent the next 19 years in the Dodgers organization as a minor league player, manager and major league coach. In the latter role, he worked under Los Angeles skipper Walter Alston for three seasons.

He later left the Dodgers organization, and worked with the San Diego Padres organization.  

In 1977, he became the first manager of the Toronto Blue Jays, helming the club for its first three seasons.

Playing career
Hartsfield played with the Boston Braves between 1950 and 1952. In 265 career games, he had a .273 batting average, 13 home runs, and 59 runs batted in during his playing career.

Managerial career

Early career
Hartsfield was a successful manager at top levels of minor league baseball, with the Spokane Indians, then the top farm team of the Los Angeles Dodgers, and the Hawaii Islanders, the San Diego Padres' top affiliate, where he won Pacific Coast League championships in 1975 and 1976. He also coached in the Majors with the Dodgers (1969–72) and Atlanta Braves (briefly in 1973).

Toronto Blue Jays

1977 season
In 1977, Hartsfield was hired as the first manager of the expansion Toronto Blue Jays by the general manager of the Blue Jays, Peter Bavasi, who had worked with him in the Dodgers and Padres organizations. Hartsfield was quoted in 1997 that "the guys I managed the year before in Hawaii (in the triple-A Pacific Coast League) were probably a better team." Hartsfield led the Blue Jays to a 54–107 record in the 1977 season. Notable games from the season include a 9–5 win against the Chicago White Sox on opening day and a 19–3 win against eventual division champions New York Yankees. The Jays finished the season 45.5 games behind the Yankees.

1978 season
The Blue Jays improved slightly, finishing the season with a record of 59–103, although they still finished the season in last place.  The Blue Jays finished second to last in runs scored and earned run average.

1979 season
In 1979, Hartsfield led the Blue Jays to a record of 53–109, their worst showing yet, and the worst showing of any American League team since 1966.  Unpopular with the Blue Jays players, by August the team was in open revolt against Hartsfield, with players airing their grievances in the media on a near-daily basis.  

Having lost over 100 games in each of his three years as manager, and having been very publicly criticized by the Toronto sports media for apparently having lost control of the team, Hartsfield was let go at the conclusion of the 1979 season and replaced by Bobby Mattick.  "This year, we should win 10 more games on attitude alone", enthused pitcher Mark Lemongello about the managerial change. In fact, the team improved by 14 games that year.

This would be Hartsfield's only managerial job in Major League Baseball. He compiled a record of 166–318 (.343) in 484 games, giving Hartsfield the worst managerial winning percentage since World War II (among managers with 200 games or more.)  His teams finished last in the American League East Division in each of his three seasons.

Later career
Hartsfield managed in the Chicago Cubs organization in 1981, starting the season with the Triple-A Iowa Oaks and finishing with the Double-A Midland Cubs.  Both teams ended up with losing records, as did the Triple-A Indianapolis Indians in 1983, which was Hartsfield's final management job.

Managerial record

Death
Hartsfield died of liver cancer at his daughter's home in Ball Ground, Georgia, on January 15, 2011, at 85.

References

External links

1925 births
2011 deaths
American expatriate baseball people in Canada
Atlanta Braves coaches
Atlanta Crackers players
Baltimore Orioles (IL) players
Baseball players from Georgia (U.S. state)
Boston Braves players
Deaths from cancer in Georgia (U.S. state)
Charleston Rebels players
Dallas Eagles players
Deaths from liver cancer
Des Moines Bruins players
Fort Worth Cats players
Greenville Spinners players
Hawaii Islanders managers
Indianapolis Indians managers
Leones del Caracas players
American expatriate baseball players in Venezuela
Los Angeles Angels (minor league) players
Los Angeles Dodgers coaches
Major League Baseball second basemen
Milwaukee Brewers (minor league) players
Montreal Royals players
Panama City Fliers players
People from Cherokee County, Georgia
Spokane Indians managers
Sportspeople from the Atlanta metropolitan area
St. Paul Saints (AA) players
Toronto Blue Jays managers
Baseball coaches from Georgia (U.S. state)
American expatriate baseball players in Colombia